Vidyapathi is a 1946 Indian, Tamil-language film produced by M. Somasundaram and Mohideen under the banner Jupiter Pictures and directed by A. T. Krishnasami. The film stars T. R. Ramachandran, T. Premavathi and K. Thavamani Devi.

Plot
A young man tells his parents that he will marry only after wooing and loving a girl. He sees an ad in a matrimonial column and goes to meet the girl. On his way he is robbed. He is left behind only with a loin cloth. A fake sadhu finds him and take with him. The fake Sadhu makes the young man into a yogi. In the meantime, a zaminder who has an affair with a devadasi (dancer), neglects his wife and daughter. The Sadhu introduces the yogi (the young man) to the young woman with an idea for making money. But the young man and woman fall in love with each other. After many twists and turns, they both marry.

Cast
Cast According to the film's song book

Male Cast
 T. R. Ramachandran as Vidyapathi 
 D. Bala Subramaniam as Zamindar 
 M. R. Swaminathan as Muruganadavi
 M. N. Nambiar as Narayana Bhagavathar
 T. N. Sivathanu as Kalyanam
 K. Srinivasan as Venu (Rowdy)
 B. Rajagopala Iyer as Ramayana Bhagavathar
 Nat Annaji Rao as Sub Magistrate
 N. S. Narayana Pillai as Sub Inspector
 T. M. Gopal as Munirathnam (Rowdy)
 N. Shankaramoorthy as Veeranna Reddy
Male Support Cast
P. G. Madhavan, M. M. A. Chinnappa, C. P. Kittan,P. M. Saminathan, R. Ramasami Iyer, A. C. Irusappa,S. T. Lakshmanan, S. Meenakshi Subramaniam,K. Jaganathan, M. Satya Narayanan, K. Rajarathnam,T. A. Natarajan, A. Ganesh Singh, T. R. Rajagopal,and D. K. Chinnappa.

Female Cast
 T. Premavathi as Aparanji
 K. Thavamani Devi as Dasi Mohanambal
 M. S. Bhagyam as Narayana Bhagavathar's Wife
 M. M. Radha Bai as Magathambal
 D. S. Krishnaveni as Female Zamindar
 T. G. Kamala Devi as Kamala
 C. K. Saraswathi as Veerayi
 R. Malathi as Malayala Bhagavathi
 D. Kamala Bai as Nurse
Female Support Cast
C. K. Nirmala, M. K. Subhadra, R. Bharathi, K. Lakshmi,N. R. Meera, M. K. Nagalakshmi, T. R. Chandra, P. P. Mary,S. S. Lalithambal, K. Thangamani, S. Govinthammal,T. P. Lakshmi, and K. Rathnam.

Production
K. Thavamani Devi performed a Western-type dance choreographed by Mrs. Rainbird and the background music was provided by C. G. Rob and his party. The Tamil song had English words intermingled which was a novelty at that time. "Here goes the song.... ‘Atho rendu (there the two)....Black eyes! Ennai paarthu (Looking at me)...Once, twice! Kannai chimitti (winking!)... Dolly! Kai kotti (with hands)...Calls me! I will dance for you!'". The English words in the song were penned by K. Thavamani Devi herself. She also designed her own costume.

Soundtrack
Music was composed by Adeppalli Rama Rao while the lyrics were penned by Udumalai Narayana Kavi. Singers are T. G. Kamala Devi, K. Thavamani Devi, T. R. Ramachandran, and M. N. Nambiar. The only playback singer is K. V. Janaki.

Reception
The film did not fare well at the box-office. Film historian Randor Guy wrote in 2010 that the film is "Remembered for the interesting storyline, witty dialogue, fine song and dance numbers and Thavamani's exciting screen presence."

References

Indian comedy films
Indian satirical films
Films based on Indian novels
1946 comedy films
1946 films
Indian black-and-white films
1940s satirical films
1940s Tamil-language films
Jupiter Pictures films